Health and fitness magazines cover a variety of topics including physical fitness and well-being, nutrition, beauty, strength, bodybuilding, and weight training.

General health and wellness
Alive
Naked Food Magazine
Prevention
Vegetarian Times
Your Health Now

Children
Children's Health
Healthy Children

Women
Fitness
Health
Muscle and Fitness Hers
Self
WomenSports (later Women's Sports and Fitness) (defunct)

Men

Men's Fitness
Men's Fitness (UK)
Men's Health

Bodybuilding and weight training
FLEX
Hardgainer
Iron Man
Milo
Muscle & Fitness
Muscle & Fitness (UK)
MuscleMag International
Muscular Development
Planet Muscle
Powerlifting USA

Health conditions
ADDitude Magazine
Arthritis Today

Martial arts
Black Belt
 Tae Kwon Do Life Magazine
Tae Kwon Do Times

References

Health and fitness